Joseph Wenglein (5 October 1845, Munich – 18 January 1919, Bad Tölz) was a German landscape painter and illustrator.

Life
He was born in Munich and is known for landscapes.
He attended both the Munich Academy of Fine Arts and the Ludwig Maximilians University, where he studied law. Eventually, he chose to focus entirely on art and found a position in the studios of the landscape painter Johann Gottfried Steffan. On his recommendation, Wenglein became a student of Adolf Heinrich Lier, whose coloristic methods were a significant influence.

His favorite areas for painting were the Bavarian plateau and the area around the Isar River. Later, he became a teacher himself. His best known student was Otto Reiniger.

References

External links

 Arcadja Auctions: 141 more paintings by Wenglein 
 Art Roots: An appreciation of Wenglein.
 catalogue of Wenglein's works (in progress)

1845 births
1919 deaths
Artists from Munich
19th-century German painters
19th-century German male artists
German male painters
20th-century German painters
20th-century German male artists